The Magnetococcaceae are a family of Alphaproteobacteria.

See also 
 List of bacterial orders
 List of bacteria genera

References 

Alphaproteobacteria